Arpita Ghosh,  is an Indian theatre artist and politician who serves as a Member of Parliament, Rajya Sabha from West Bengal. She has served as the Member of Parliament of the 16th Lok Sabha for Balurghat (Lok Sabha constituency), West Bengal. She won the 2014 Indian general election being an All India Trinamool Congress candidate.

A theatre director, actor and playwright turned politician, she graduated B.Sc. from the Scottish Church College at the University of Calcutta.

Career
Arpita Ghosh began her career in the theater in 1998 at age 31. She acted and directed throughout the early 2000s.

Early life and theatre journey
Arpita Ghosh joined theatre at the end of 1998. She started working in a group named ‘Fourth Wall’ for more than a year and acted in two major plays of the group. 
In January 2000 she joined Pancham Ved Charjashram as a student of theatre. After completing the course of 1 year, she started working with Pancham Vaidic.

Pancham Vaidic activities
In 2003 Arpita first directed a children's play named ‘Ha Ja Ba Ra La’, based on a story by Sukumar Ray, dramatised by  herself.
In 2003 only she also directed a small play named ‘Antargata Aagun’ written by Tirthankar Chanda.
In 2004 she translated ‘Crime Passionnel’, a play by Jean Paul Sartre which was directed by Saoli Mitra, where she acted as the lead female character. This play was later staged in Bharat Rang Mahotsav in 2010.
In 2005 she directed two plays named ‘Lankadahan Pala’, by Lila Majumdar and ‘Ghater Katha’, by Rabindranath Tagore. She revived the latter play in 2014 in a different form. 
In 2005 Pancham Vaidic produced its play ‘Chandaali’, a dramatised version of Chandaalika by Rabindranath Tagore, directed by Saoli Mitra, where she played the role of Prakriti, the central character. Pancham Vaidic staged this play in Bharat Rang Mahotsav in 2005.
In 2006 Arpita translated, dramatised & directed ‘Animal Farm’, a novel by George Orwell. The Bengali play was named ‘Poshukhamar’. The play became very popular in West Bengal. 
In 2007 Arpita got the invitation from “Airtel-Mukhomukhi Young Director’s Festival” held in Kolkata, where she staged a play named ‘Tokolosh’, translated, dramatised & directed by her. It is a translated version of Ronald Segal's popular novel ‘Tokolosh’.  
In 2008 Pancham Vaidic staged a new play on 22 August named ‘Narokiyo’, written & directed by Arpita Ghosh where she talked about anti-violence. The play was revived again in 2013. 
In 2009 Pancham Vaidic staged a new play on 24 May, named ‘A-parajita’, (compilation of 3 short stories by Tagore) dramatised & directed by Arpita Ghosh. 
In 2010 Pancham Vaidic staged a new play on 22 August, named ‘Ghare-Baire’, (based on Tagore's novel in the same name) dramatised  & directed by Arpita Ghosh. 
In 2011 Pancham Vaidic staged a play named ‘Ebong Debjani’ (based on an episode in Mahabharata) dramatised & directed by Arpita Ghosh. She also acted in a lead role.
In 2012 Pancham Vaidic staged the play ‘Achalayatan’ – a play by Gurudev Rabindranath Tagore, directed and acted by Arpita Ghosh
In 2013 Pancham Vaidic staged ‘Astomito Madhyanha’ – a play based on Arthur Koestler’s “Darkness at Noon” – adapted, translated, dramatised & directed by Arpita Ghosh
In 2013, Arpita also did her first solo acting in Pancham Vaidic’s production ‘Streer Potro’ written by Gurudev Rabindranath Tagore, dramatized and directed by Arpita herself.
In 2014, Arpita directed Pancham Vaidic's production “Duto Din” – play written by Bratya Basu. Arpita also acted in a leading role in the production.
In 2015, Arpita adapted, scripted and directed the latest production of Pancham Vaidic “Karubasana” – based on late poet Jibanananda Das’s novel in the same name. The play was first staged in August 2015.

Acting in other groups
In 2013 Arpita directed the play ‘Kharir Tir’ – produced by Naihati Samay 1400 where she also acted in the lead role.
In 2014 Arpita did her second solo acting in Bratya Basu's lyrical drama ‘Apatoto Eibhabe Dujoner Dekha Hoye Thake’ – directed by Debesh Chattopadhyay and produced by Sansriti, Kolkata

Translations & adaptations
Crime Passionnel, a play by Jean Paul Sartre (2004) into "Rajnaitik Hatya?"
Animal Farm, novel by George Orwell (2006) into "Poshu Khamar"
Tokolosh, a play by Ronald Segal (2007) into "Tokolosh"
Darkness at noon, novel by Arthur Koestler (2013) into "Astomito Madhyanha"

Literary works

Awards
"Satya Bandyopadhyay Smriti Purashkar" for the year 2005 as Best Actress for award for her work in “Rajnaitik Hatya?”
“Shyamal Sen Smriti Purashkar” for her contribution as Director and Actress in 2007.

Plays directed
Ha-Ja-Ba-Ra-La, (2003)
Antargata Agun, (2003).
Lanka Dahan Pala, (2004)Ghater Katha, (2004)Poshu Khamar, (2006)Tokolosh, (2007)Narokiyo, (2008)A-Parajita, (2009)Ghare Baire, (2010)Ebong Debjani, (2011)Astomito Madhyanha, (2012)Achalayatan, (2013)Streer Potro, (2013)Kharir Tir, (2013)Duto Din, (2014)Karubasana, (2015)Machi'', (2017)

See also
Shreyan Chattopadhyay
Bratya Basu
Debesh Chattopadhyay
Suman Mukhopadhyay
Kaushik Sen
Sujan Mukhopadhyay

References
 - The Telegraph 26 August 2014
http://soumyadesarkar.blogspot.in/2015/02/arpita-and-debesh-to-form-new-theatre.html
http://gulfnews.com/life-style/celebrity/desi-news/bollywood/arpita-ghosh-to-debut-in-indecent-proposal-1.1377079 - Gulf News 27 August 2014
http://indiatoday.intoday.in/story/Directors+cut/1/5677.html - India Today 12 March 2008
http://www.newsbharati.com/Encyc/2016/8/6/EZCC-Kolkata-Theatre-Festival-2016
 - The Telegraph 2 September 2005
http://www.anandabazar.com/supplementary/patrika/rehearsal-of-the-drama-karubasana-produced-by-pancham-vaidik-1.191690 - ABP 15 August 2015

External links
Official biographical sketch in Parliament of India website

India MPs 2014–2019
Lok Sabha members from West Bengal
Scottish Church College alumni
University of Calcutta alumni
Politicians from Kolkata
Indian theatre directors
Bengali theatre personalities
People from Dakshin Dinajpur district
Living people
Women in West Bengal politics
21st-century Indian women politicians
21st-century Indian politicians
Indian women theatre directors
1966 births
Trinamool Congress politicians from West Bengal
Bengali Hindus